The burning of the Jaffna Public Library (Yāḻ potu nūlakam erippu; Sinhala: යාපනය මහජන පුස්තකාලය ගිනිබත් කිරීම, Yāpanaya mahajana pustakālaya ginibat kirīma) took place on the night of June 1, 1981, when an organized mob of Sinhalese individuals went on a rampage, burning the library. It was one of the most violent examples of ethnic biblioclasm of the 20th century. At the time of its destruction, the library was one of the biggest in Asia, containing over 97,000 books and manuscripts.

Background
The library was built in many stages starting from 1933, from a modest beginning as a private collection. Soon, with the help of primarily local citizens, it became a full-fledged library. The library also became a repository of archival material written in palm leaf manuscripts, original copies of regionally important historic documents in the contested political history of Sri Lanka and newspapers that were published hundreds of years ago in the Jaffna peninsula. It thus became a place of historic and symbolic importance to all Sri Lankans.

Eventually, the first major wing of the library was opened in 1959 by then Jaffna mayor Alfred Duraiappah. The architect of the Indo-Saracenic style building was S. Narasimhan from Madras, India. Prominent Indian librarian S.R. Ranganathan served as an advisor to ensure that the library was built to international standards. The library became the pride of the local people as even researchers from India and other countries began to use it for their research purposes.

The riot and the burning

On Sunday, May 31, 1981, the Tamil United Liberation Front (TULF), a regionally popular democratic party, held a rally in which three Sinhalese policemen were shot and two killed.

That night police and paramilitaries began a pogrom that lasted for three days. The head office of TULF party was destroyed. The Jaffna MP V. Yogeswaran's residence was also destroyed.

Four people were pulled from their homes and killed at random. Many business establishments and a local Hindu temple were also deliberately destroyed.

On the night of June 1, according to many eyewitnesses, police and government-sponsored paramilitias set fire to the Jaffna public library and destroyed it completely. Over 97,000 volumes of books along with numerous culturally important and irreplaceable manuscripts were destroyed. Among the destroyed items were scrolls of historical value and the works and manuscripts of philosopher, artist and author Ananda Coomaraswamy and prominent intellectual Prof. Dr. Isaac Thambiah. The destroyed articles included memoirs and works of writers and dramatists who made a significant contribution toward the sustenance of the Tamil culture, and those of locally reputed physicians and politicians.

The office of the Eelanaadu, a local newspaper, was also destroyed. Statues of Tamil cultural and religious figures were destroyed or defaced.

Nancy Murray wrote in a journal article in 1984 that several high-ranking security officers and two cabinet ministers were present in the town of Jaffna, when uniformed security men and plainclothes mob carried out organized acts of destruction. After 20 years the government-owned Daily News newspaper, in an editorial in 2001, termed the 1981 event an act by "goon squads let loose by the then government".

Reaction
Two cabinet ministers, who saw the destruction of government and private properties from the verandah of the Jaffna Rest House (a government-owned hotel), claimed that the incident was

The national newspapers did not report the incident. In subsequent parliamentary debates some majority Sinhalese members told minority Tamil politicians that if Tamils were unhappy in Sri Lanka, they should leave for their 'homeland' in India. A direct quote from a United National Party member is

- Mr. W.J.M. Lokubandara, MP in Sri Lanka's Parliament, July 1981.

Of all the destruction in Jaffna city, it was the destruction of the Jaffna Public Library that was the incident which appeared to cause the most distress to the people of Jaffna. Twenty years later, the mayor of Jaffna Nadarajah Raviraj still grieved at the recollection of the flames he saw as a university student.

For Tamils, the devastated library became a symbol of "physical and imaginative violence". The attack was seen as an assault on their aspirations, the value of learning and traditions of academic achievement. The attack also became the rallying point for Tamil rebels to promote the idea to the Tamil populace that their race was targeted for annihilation.

President Ranasinghe Premadasa
In 1991 the then president of Sri Lanka Ranasinghe Premadasa publicly proclaimed that

He was accusing his political opponents within his UNP party, Lalith Athulathmudali and Gamini Dissanayake, who had just brought an impeachment motion against him, as directly involved in the burning of the library in 1981.

President Mahinda Rajapakse

In 2006 the president of Sri Lanka Mahinda Rajapakse was quoted as saying,

He was also further quoted as saying in reference to a prominent local Tamil poet, reminding the audience that

He concluded in that speech that as a cumulative effect of all these atrocities, the peaceful voice of the Tamils is now drowned in the echo of the gun; referring to the rebel LTTE's terrorism.

Prime Minister Ranil Wickremesinghe 
In 2016, Prime Minister Ranil Wickremesinghe as the leader of the United National Party apologized for the burning of the library which happened during a UNP government. He was interrupted by the shouting of Joint Opposition MPs for which he claimed

Government investigation
According to Orville H. Schell, Chairman of the Americas Watch Committee, and Head of Amnesty International's 1982 fact-finding mission to Sri Lanka, the UNP government at that time did not institute an independent investigation to establish responsibility for these killings in May and June 1981 and take measures against those responsible. No one has been indicted for the crimes yet.

Reopening

In 1982, one year after the initial destruction, the community sponsored Jaffna Public Library Week and collected thousands of books. Repairs on parts of the building were in progress when the Black July pogrom-induced civil conflict began in 1983. By 1984, the library was fully renovated; however, the library was damaged by bullets and bombs. The military forces were stationed in the Jaffna Fort and the rebels positioned themselves inside the library creating a no man's land as the fighting intensified. In 1985, after an attack on a nearby police station by Tamil rebels, soldiers entered the partially restored building and set off bombs that shredded thousands of books yet again. The library was abandoned with its shell and bullet-pocked walls, blackened with the smoke of burnt books.

As an effort to win back the confidence of the Tamil people and also to mollify international opinion, in 1998 under president Chandrika Kumaratunga, the government began the process to rebuild it with contributions from all Sri Lankans and foreign governments.
Approximately US$1 million was spent and over 25,000 books were collected. By 2001 the replacement building was complete but the 2003 reopening of the rebuilt library was opposed by the rebel LTTE. This led all 21 members of the Jaffna municipal council, led by Mayor Sellan Kandian, to tender their resignation as a protest against the pressure exerted on them to postpone the reopening.
Eventually the library was opened to the public.

See also

1981 Anti-Tamil pogrom
 Book burning
 Cultural genocide
 Destruction of Library of Alexandria
 Burning of books and burying of scholars
 Burning of Nalanda University Library
 List of anti-minority pogroms in Sri Lanka
 Sri Lankan Civil War

Notes

References

Further reading

 Rebecca Knuth (2003), Libricide: The Regime-Sponsored Destruction of Books and Libraries in the Twentieth Century.  New York: Praeger. 
 Rebecca Knuth (2006), Burning Books and Leveling Libraries: Extremist Violence and Cultural Destruction.  New York: Praeger. 
 Nicholas A. Basbanes (2003), A Splendor of Letters: The Permanence of Books in an Impermanent World.  New York: HarperCollins.

External links
 History in Flames: Remembering the burning of Jaffna Library
 Official website of the Jaffna library
 Jaffna library vandalized 2010
 Documentary on the burning of the library by Someetharan
 History of the Jaffna public library
 Burning Books – Reported by Kevin Sites
 Jaffna Library burning Website

1981 fires in Asia
1981 in Sri Lanka
1981 riots
Arson in Asia
Book burnings
Events relating to freedom of expression
Burning of Jaffna Public Library
History of Sri Lanka (1948–present)
June 1981 events in Asia
Library fires
Mass murder in 1981
Origins of the Sri Lankan Civil War
Political repression
Politics of Sri Lanka
Pogroms
Riots and civil disorder in Sri Lanka
Spree shootings in Sri Lanka